Shelly Manne & His Men Play Checkmate (full title Shelly Manne & His Men Play the Music of John Williams from the TV Series Checkmate) is an album by drummer Shelly Manne's group Shelly Manne & His Men performing John Williams' score from the TV show Checkmate, recorded in 1961 and released on the Contemporary label.

Reception

The AllMusic review by Scott Yanow states: "None of the melodies caught on but at least they gave these fine musicians some fresh material to improvise on. However, this album is not essential despite some strong solos". The Penguin Guide to Jazz called it "nothing too memorable; just a very competent and thoroughly enjoyable jazz disc."

Track listing
All compositions by John Williams
 "Checkmate" - 8:04
 "The Isolated Pawn" - 6:10
 "Cyanide Touch" - 7:46
 "The King Swings" - 5:34
 "En Passant" - 5:46
 "Fireside Eyes" - 3:52
 "The Black Knight" - 6:37

Personnel
Shelly Manne - drums
Conte Candoli - trumpet
Richie Kamuca - tenor saxophone
Russ Freeman - piano
Chuck Berghofer - bass

References

1962 albums
Contemporary Records albums
Shelly Manne albums